Instant Schlager is the first studio album by the Danish rock band Warm Guns, released in 1980 on Vertigo.

It was the band's second release, as they had released the live mini-album First Shot Live the year before. The single "The Young Go First" was a small national radio hit and an Australian Top 20 single. Danish singer Henning Stærk recorded "Under My Skin" on the EP Henning Stærk in 1981.

Background and recording 
Before recording, Warm Guns assembled in Lars Muhl's basement and began arranging the songs with the co-producer Robert Hauschildt. The musicians stood in a circle with two small amplifiers and tea towels placed over the drums. According to Lars Muhl, "From the center of the circle, Robert was in charge. Thanks to him, it was a tour de force of stripping a rockband to the bone. Anything unnecessary was removed."

Evenings were spent going over lyrical ideas, and three weeks later the arrangements were in place. In February 1980, Warm Guns began recording at Werner Studio in Copenhagen and recorded the album in two weeks. The album was produced by Robert Hauschildt and Warm Guns, except "“The Young Go First" which was produced by Nils Henriksen.

Critical reception 
According to the Danish magazine MM, the album title expressed the immediate intent in short form: utility music, pop, something that "hits". The band, and especially Muhl, was compared to Elvis Costello, as being "more Costello than Costello himself". MM wrote that Warm Guns performed just as easy, fast and determined as many English rock bands, and that the action and catchiness promised in the album title were evident in many of the songs - "The Young Go First", "Under My Skin" and "Shiny Shoes" - because of their semi-familiar melodies - "I’ll Get You", "She’s A Go Go Getter" and "Back In The 80′s", due to the band's aggression and dynamic energy.

Track listing

Side 1 
 Back In The 80s (Muhl) - 2:53
 The Young Go First (Muhl) - 4:27
 I'll Get You (Muhl/Muhl-Hauschildt) - 2:00
 Welcome In The CIA (Muhl) - 2:14
 Under My Skin (Muhl) - 3:19
 She's A Go-Go-Getter (Muhl/Hauschildt) - 2:18

Side 2 
 Run Deep (Muhl) - 2:48
 Rip Off (Muhl/Hauschildt) - 2:33
 Get Up (Muhl) - 2:34
 Shiny Shoes (Muhl) - 2:52
 Snapshot (Warm Guns) - 1:27
 So What? (Muhl) - 2:41

Personnel 
 Lars Muhl - vocals, keyboards
 Lars Hybel - guitar, bass guitar
 Jacob Perbøll - guitar, bass guitar
 Jens G. Nielsen - drums

Production 
 Robert Hauschildt & Warm Guns - producers
 Nils Henriksen - producer ("The Young Go First")
 Werner Scherrer - engineer
 Ernst Mikael Jørgensen - supervisor
 Poul Erik Veigaard - photographs
 Heartbreak Prod. - cover design
 ROCK ON - management

Notes

References 
 Villemoes, Lars (1980): Det Virtuelle Musikbibliotek on dvm.nu. Review, MM (Retrieved 02-09-2015)
 Deleuran, Peter og Jan Knus (1985): Gnags – Kan I høre noget. Aarhus: Forlaget Modtryk
Bille, Torben (1997): Politikens Dansk Rock. Politikens Forlag 
Muhl, Lars (1993): Sjæl I Flammer. Hovedland

External links 
 Discogs.com

Vertigo Records albums
1980 debut albums
Warm Guns albums